Vojinović (Serbian Cyrillic: Војиновић,  Vojinovići / Војиновићи) was a medieval Serbian noble family which during the 14th century played an important role in the Serbian Empire, especially after the death of Emperor Dušan (King 1331–1346, emperor 1346–1355), when during the Fall of the Serbian Empire its representative Grand Dukes Vojislav Vojinović (around 1355–1363), and later his cousin Nikola Altomanović (1366–1373) were the strongest district masters in medieval Serbia.

History
The family's ancestor of unknown name had four sons, out of whom two are known by personal names, Hrvatin and Vojin. The family's noble lineage founder was the latter Vojvoda Vojin, who during the reign of Stefan Dečanski controlled areas around Gacko. Over the years, their property expanded, and his heirs, Vojislav, and Nikola, held an area from the borders of the Republic of Ragusa, Bay of Kotor and Zvečan Fortress to Rudnik. The power of the last representative of Vojinović, broke the joint coalition that consisted of Prince Lazar (1371–1389) and the Ban Tvrtko (Ban 1353–1377, King 1377–1391), with the support of King of Hungary Louis I (1342–1382) who sent the Ban of Mačva Nikola Gorjanski Elder with 1000 lancers, during the summer and autumn of 1373. The lands of Vojisavljević were split, and Nikola was captured and blinded in Užice Fortress, after which he received a small estate on which he died after 1398, when was the last time he was mentioned in sources as alive. During the 14th century the Vojinović family was connected with other Serbian noble families, such as the Branivojevići and the Mladenovići.

Legacy
The power of the Vojinović family left its mark in Serbian folk tradition, so that they appear in the epic folk poetry, in the Pre-Kosovan Cycle (Miloš Vojinović), and they are mentioned as builders and architects of Serbian medieval buildings in Vučitrn, Old Bridge (Vojinovića most) and fort (Vojinovića Kula).

According to folklore, the family hailed from Kosovo, from Vučitrn, where the Vojinović Bridge and Vojinović Tower are located.

Vojinović family members 
 Unknown
 Unknown
 Unknown
 Hrvatin (end of 13th century-6 March 1349), veliki čelnik, controlled area around Rudine and more, in 1325 plundered Dubrovnik with brother Vojin, had his own group of people one of whom stole a horse in 1330, identified with Dimitrije buried at Church of St. Nicholas in Banja.
 Vojin (1322–1347), Vojvoda of Stefan Dečanski, and Emperor Dušan,
 Miloš Vojinović, in service to the Emperor Dušan, participated in the sale of Ston and Pelješac to Dubrovnik, died after December 1332.
 Altoman Vojinović (1347–1359), married to Ratoslava Mladenović (Sister of subsequent Sebastokrator Branko Mladenović, father of Vuk Branković (1371–1391))
Nikola Altomanović Vojinović (born 1348, died after the 1398, ruled 1366–1373), Grand Župan, after his father's death, in 1359, he was suppressed by uncle Vojislav, after whose death, 1363 he restored his lands.
 Vojislav Vojinović (around 1355–1363), grand duke, married to Goislava
 Dobrivoj, after his father's death, in 1363, while was still a child, suppressed by his cousin Nikola.
 Stefan, after his father's death, in 1363, while was still a child, suppressed by his cousin Nikola.
 Vojislava Vojinović, married to Brajko Branivojević, after his death in 1326, the young king Dušan intermediates to be released from prison in Dubrovnik.

References

Sources

See also

List of Serbian monarchs
Vojnović noble family

 
14th century in Serbia
Serbian noble families